"Liberate" is a song by the American heavy metal band Disturbed. The song was released as the third and last single from their second studio album, Believe.

The single peaked at number 21 on the Bubbling Under Hot 100 Singles chart, number 4 in the Mainstream Rock Tracks chart and number 22 in the Modern Rock Tracks chart.

Chart performance

Personnel
 David Draiman – lead vocals, backing vocals
 Dan Donegan – guitar
 Steve Kmak – bass guitar
 Mike Wengren – drums

Other appearances
"Liberate" was featured in the video game Tony Hawk's Underground 2.
A remixed version was included as a B-side for The Matrix Reloaded: The Album.

See also
Isaiah 1
Isaiah 2

References

2003 singles
2002 songs
Disturbed (band) songs
Reprise Records singles
Songs written by Dan Donegan
Songs written by David Draiman
Songs written by Mike Wengren
Song recordings produced by Johnny K